Archaic Roman religion may refer to:

Archaic Roman Religion (La Religion romaine archaïque in French), a 1966 book by philologist Georges Dumézil
The religion in ancient Rome